The Hadol is a village and former non-salute princely state in Gujarat, Western India.

History 
The Sixth Class princely state and taluka, covering  Mahi Kantha, was ruled by Kshatriya Makwana Koli. Hadol, Vakhat Sinh, Makwana Koli by caste, is the present Talukdar. He pays a tribute of Rs. 1,025-2-9 to the Gaekwad of Baroda and Rs 218 to the Idar State as Khichdi Hakka. The Talukdar is ranked among sixth class chiefs, so he enjoys civil and criminal powers as the Talukdar of Hadol.
Residence - Hara, Mahi Kantha Agency: Bombay Presidency.  Chieftains, who were 'non-jurisdictional' talukdars, the state being within the jurisdiction of Gadhwara thana.

In 1901, it comprised the nineteen villages, with a combined population of 2,665, yielding 3,983 Rupees state revenue (1903-1904, half from land), paying double tribute: 113 Rupees to the Gaikwar Baroda State and 41 to the Idar State.

References

External links 
 Imperial Gazetteer, on DSAL.UChicago.edu - Mahi Kantha

Princely states of Gujarat
Koli princely states